Daphne in Cottage D is a 1967 play written by Stephen Levi. The play premiered on Broadway on October 15, 1967 after previews from October 9, 1967, and closed on November 18, 1967 after 41 performances. The play starred Sandy Dennis and William Daniels, and was directed by Martin Fried.

The play is set in a resort on the New England coast.

The play's troubled production was profiled in the William Goldman book The Season: A Candid Look at Broadway.

References

External links
 

1967 plays